Yan Aung Kyaw (born 4 August 1986) is a retired footballer from Burma, and was a midfielder for the Myanmar national football team. He is the three time Myanmar National League winner with Yangon United and the bronze medalist with Myanmar U23 in 2011 SEA Games.

International

Honours

National Team
Philippine Peace Cup (1): 2014

Club

Yangon United
Myanmar National League (4): 2011, 2012, 2013, 2015
MFF Cup (1): 2011

References

1989 births
Living people
Sportspeople from Yangon
Burmese footballers
Myanmar international footballers
Yangon United F.C. players
Association football midfielders
Southeast Asian Games bronze medalists for Myanmar
Southeast Asian Games medalists in football
Competitors at the 2011 Southeast Asian Games